Yugoslavia competed at the 1980 Winter Paralympics in Geilo, Norway. Nine competitors from Yugoslavia competed in two sports but did not win a medal. The country finished 11th in the medal table.

Alpine skiing 

Five athletes competed in alpine skiing and they competed in the following events:

 Men's Giant Slalom 3A
 Men's Slalom 3A
 Men's Giant Slalom 1A
 Men's Slalom 1A

No medals were won.

Cross-country 

Four athletes competed in cross-country skiing. No medals were won.

See also 

 Yugoslavia at the Paralympics
 Yugoslavia at the 1980 Winter Olympics

References 

Yugoslavia at the Paralympics
1980 in Yugoslav sport
Nations at the 1980 Winter Paralympics